Mildbraedia carpinifolia is a species of plant in the family Euphorbiaceae. It is found in Kenya, Mozambique, and Tanzania.

References

Crotoneae
Vulnerable plants
Flora of Africa
Taxonomy articles created by Polbot
Taxobox binomials not recognized by IUCN